Divaricate means branching, or having separation or a degree of separation. The angle between branches is wide.

In botany

In botany, the term is often used to describe the branching pattern of plants.  Plants are said to be divaricating when their growth form is such that each internode diverges widely from the previous internode producing an often tightly interlaced shrub or small tree. Of the 72 small leaved shrubs found on the Banks Peninsula, for example, some 38 are divaricating.

In medicine

See also
 Diastasis (pathology), a medical term for separation of parts
 Laciniate

References 

Plant morphology
Medical terminology